Zylberman is a surname. Notable people with the surname include:

Geula Zylberman (born 1931), Venezuelan artist
Noam Zylberman (born 1973), Israeli voice actor
Ruth Zylberman (born 1971), French Director, Author

See also
Zilberman

Jewish surnames
Yiddish-language surnames